Michael Hester (born 2 May 1972), is a former New Zealand association football referee in the A-League. Holder of a FIFA international licence, he has participated at the highest level, officiating at the 2010 FIFA World Cup.

Biography
Hester has been a NZFC certified referee since 2004 and gained his FIFA international qualification in January 2007. He refereed some games in the 2008 Summer Olympics, and has also refereed matches in the Oceania qualification group for the 2010 FIFA World Cup.

He was also appointed as a referee for the 2009 FIFA Under 17 World Cup in Nigeria.

Hester was included on the short list to officiate at the 2010 FIFA World Cup in South Africa along with fellow New Zealand referee Peter O'Leary, both of whom were confirmed in the final 30 officials to take charge at the finals. On 12 June 2010 he refereed the FIFA World Cup game between Greece and South Korea. Hester blew the final whistle on his refereeing career at the end of the 2011 New Zealand winter season to focus on his career in the Royal New Zealand Navy.

Personal life
He has worked, besides his football career, as a naval officer in Auckland, and played both Rugby union and football before turning to officiating.

Honours
 2009: NZDF Sports Award: Outstanding Sports Person of the Year
2017: Official referee of The Football Ramble

References

1972 births
Living people
Australian soccer referees
New Zealand association football referees
FIFA World Cup referees
2010 FIFA World Cup referees
Sportspeople from Sydney
New Zealand rugby union players
People from Auckland
Royal New Zealand Navy personnel